Kala Lynne Savage (born October 16, 1978) is an American actress. She is best known for the TV series Undressed, Santa Barbara, and 8 Simple Rules.

Early life 
Savage was born in Highland Park, Illinois, the daughter of Joanne and Lewis Savage, who were an industrial real estate broker and a consultant. Her older brother is actor/director Fred Savage, known for The Wonder Years and her younger brother is actor/director Ben Savage known for Boy Meets World. Her grandparents were Jewish and from Poland, Ukraine, Germany, and Latvia, and Savage was raised in Reform Judaism.

Filmography

Film

Television

Soundtrack

References

External links
 

Living people
Actresses from Chicago
American child actresses
American film actresses
American people of German-Jewish descent
American people of Latvian-Jewish descent
American people of Polish-Jewish descent
American people of Ukrainian-Jewish descent
American television actresses
American Ashkenazi Jews
Jewish American actresses
20th-century American actresses
21st-century American actresses
21st-century American Jews
1978 births
American Reform Jews